Lyubimovka, rural localities in Russia, may refer to:

 Lyubimovka, Bashkortostan
 Lyubimovka, Bolshesoldatsky District, Kursk Oblast
 Lyubimovka, Fatezhsky District, Kursk Oblast
 Lyubimovka, Korenevsky District, Kursk Oblast
 Lyubimovka, Medvensky District, Kursk Oblast

See also
 Liubymivka (disambiguation)